Jonathan Ernest "John" Gillman (born 7 February 1935) is an Australian sports shooter. He competed in the men's 50 metre free pistol event at the 1976 Summer Olympics.

References

1935 births
Living people
Australian male sport shooters
Olympic shooters of Australia
Shooters at the 1976 Summer Olympics
People from Kerang